Trude Berliner (28 February 1903 – 26 February 1977) was a German actress. She was one of many Jewish actors and actresses who were forced to flee Europe when the Nazis came to power in 1933.

Biography
Berliner was born Gertrude Berliner in Berlin, Germany].  She became a famous cabaret performer in Berlin. In 1925, she appeared in her first movie, a silent film called Krieg im Frieden. Berliner would wait four years before her second movie, but her film career would then take off. In 1929, she appeared in Dich hab ich geliebt, which would become the first German talkie released in the United States. Berliner appeared in a number of well known movies in Germany during the 1930s, including Masken, The Invisible Front,  and Kaiserwalzer. Es war einmal ein Musikus (1933) was her last movie in Germany; it also featured S.Z. Sakall, in the fourth German movie that the two appeared in together.
            
Being Jewish, she left Germany when Hitler and the Nazi Party came to power in 1933 and went to France. In 1939, she immigrated to the United States.  However, in Hollywood Berliner was not able to continue her promising movie career, receiving only bit roles in four movies. Her first role in an American film did not come until 1942, in Casablanca. She portrayed a woman playing baccarat with a Dutch banker (played by Torben Meyer).  She appears in a scene with her four-time co-star from her career in Germany, S.Z. Sakall, when she says to his character, Carl the waiter, "Will you ask Rick if he will have a drink with us?", to which Carl responds, "Madame, he never drinks with customers. Never. I have never seen it."

Later that year, she had another bit part in the World War II romance Reunion in France, and in 1943 she played Frau Reitler in The Strange Death of Adolf Hitler. Her last American movie was a small uncredited role as a German actress in the musical The Dolly Sisters in 1945, again appearing with S.Z. Sakall. She did not appear on film again until 1955, with a small role in her final film, the West German production Before God and Man.
            
Berliner lived quietly in California until she died on February 26, 1977, in San Diego, just two days shy of her 74th birthday.

Selected filmography

 Adamants letztes Rennen (1916) - Kind
 The Secret Agent (1924) - Zofe
 The Fire Dancer (1925)
 War in Peace (1925) - Ilka von Etvös - Tochter des Generals
 A Modern Casanova (1928) - Nina Ly
 Tempo! Tempo! (1929) - Mila
 The Circus Princess (1929)
 Hungarian Nights (1929)
 It's You I Have Loved (1929) - Edith Karin
 Marriage in Trouble (1929)
 Sturm auf drei Herzen (1930)
 Masks (1930)
 The Tiger Murder Case (1930) - Trude
 The Rhineland Girl (1930) - Grete
 Ein Walzer im Schlafcoupé (1930) - Lolo Marelli - Chansonette
 Pension Schöller (1930) - Fiffi
 The Singing City (1930) - Carmela - neapolitanisches Mädchen
 A Girl from the Reeperbahn (1930) - Margot
 Three Days of Love (1931) - Carla
 Circus Life (1931) - Kitty Rallay
 Every Woman Has Something (1931) - Olivia Dangerfield
 Ich heirate meinen Mann (1931) - Liane Colberg
 Der Stumme von Portici (1931) - Carmen
 Checkmate (1931) - Erika, Tänzerin
 My Heart Longs for Love (1931) - Elly Wallis
 Der verjüngte Adolar (1931) - Dodo Domani, Tänzerin
 Weekend in Paradise (1931) - Tutti, Animierdame
 Der Hochtourist (1931) - Lore Heller
 The Pride of Company Three (1932) - Vera, Stimmungssängerin
 Night Convoy (1932) - Spielklarissa
 Fräulein - Falsch verbunden (1932) - Lotte Schröder
 Durchlaucht amüsiert sich (1932) - Fifi
 Ein Prinz verliebt sich (1932)
 Modern Dowry (1932) - Molly Barun
 Die Zwei vom Südexpress (1932) - Marie
  (1932) - Juliette
 Ship Without a Harbour (1932) - Lilly Steffens
 The Invisible Front (1932) - Trude
 A Thousand for One Night (1933) - Tanzsoubrette Ossy Walden
 The Emperor's Waltz (1933) - Annemarie Schulz aus Berlin
 Es war einmal ein Musikus (1933) - Eva
 Casablanca (1942) - Baccarat Player at Rick's (uncredited)
 Reunion in France (1942) - Customer (uncredited)
 The Strange Death of Adolf Hitler (1943) - Frau Reitler
 The Dolly Sisters (1945) - German Actress (uncredited)
 Before God and Man (1955) -  Frau Vikarin (final film role)

External links
 
 
 
 
 Photographs of Trude Berliner

1903 births
1977 deaths
German stage actresses
German film actresses
German silent film actresses
Jewish German actresses
Jewish emigrants from Nazi Germany to the United States
20th-century German actresses